Randhir Kumar Singh is an Indian politician. He was elected to the Jharkhand Legislative Assembly from Sarath in the 2019 Jharkhand Legislative Assembly election as a member of Bharatiya Janata Party.

References 

1977 births
Living people
Bharatiya Janata Party politicians from Jharkhand
Members of the Jharkhand Legislative Assembly
Place of birth missing (living people)